The Rider–Waite Tarot is a widely popular deck for tarot card reading. It is also known as the Waite–Smith, Rider–Waite–Smith, or Rider Tarot. Based on the instructions of academic and mystic A. E. Waite and illustrated by Pamela Colman Smith, both members of the Hermetic Order of the Golden Dawn, the cards were originally published by the Rider Company in 1909. The deck has been published in numerous editions and inspired a wide array of variants and imitations. It is estimated that more than 100 million copies of the deck exist in more than 20 countries.

Overview 
While the images are simple, the details and backgrounds feature abundant symbolism. Some imagery remains similar to that found in earlier decks, but overall the Waite–Smith card designs are substantially different from their predecessors. Christian imagery was removed from some cards, and added to others. For example, the "Papess" became the "High Priestess" and no longer features a Papal tiara, while the "Lovers" card, previously depicting a medieval scene of a clothed man and woman receiving a blessing from a noble or cleric was changed to a depiction of the naked Adam and Eve in the Garden of Eden, and the ace of cups featuring a dove carrying Sacramental bread. The Minor Arcana are illustrated with allegorical scenes by Smith, where earlier decks (with a few rare exceptions) had simple designs for the Minor Arcana.

The symbols and imagery used in the deck were influenced by the 19th-century magician and occultist Eliphas Levi, as well as by the teachings of the Hermetic Order of the Golden Dawn. In order to accommodate the astrological correspondences taught by the Golden Dawn, Waite introduced several innovations to the deck. He switched the order of the Strength and Justice cards so that Strength corresponded with Leo and Justice corresponded with Libra. He also based the Lovers card on Italian tarot decks, which have two persons and an angel, to reinforce its correspondence with Gemini.

Major Arcana

Minor Arcana

Wands

Cups

Swords

Pentacles

Publication
The cards were first published during December 1909, by the publisher William Rider & Son of London. The first printing was extremely limited and featured card backs with a roses and lilies pattern. A much larger printing was done during March of 1910, featuring better quality card stock and a "cracked mud" card back design. This edition, often referred to as the "A" deck, was published from 1910 to 1920. Rider continued publishing the deck in various editions until 1939, then again from 1971 to 1977.

All of the Rider editions up to 1939 were available with a small guide written by A. E. Waite providing an overview of the traditions and history of the cards, texts about interpretations, and extensive descriptions of their symbols. The first version of this guide was published during 1909 and was titled The Key to the Tarot. A year later, a revised version, The Pictorial Key to the Tarot, was issued that featured black-and-white plates of all seventy-eight of Smith's illustrations.

In 2009, U.S. Games Systems published a commemorative deck titled "The Smith-Waite Centennial Deck" as part of The Pamela Colman Smith Commemorative Set celebrating the hundredth anniversary of the 1909 deck. This deck notably places Smith's name first and omits the publisher's name (Rider.) In this vein, some contemporary tarot readers call the original deck and its various iterations the "Smith-Waite deck" in order to give credit and focus to Smith's contribution to the deck.

Copyright status
The original version of the Rider–Waite Tarot is in the public domain in all countries that have a copyright term of 70 years or fewer after the death of the last co-author. This includes the United Kingdom, where the deck was originally published.
	
In the United States, the deck became part of the public domain in 1966 (publication + 28 years + renewed 28 years), and thus has been available for use by American artists for numerous different media projects. U.S. Games Systems has a copyright claim on their updated version of the deck published in 1971, but this only applies to new material added to the pre-existing work (e.g. designs on the card backs and the box).

References

External links 

 

Card games introduced in 1909
Divination Tarot decks